Life Sucks... And Then You Die! was the debut album by Cerebral Fix – a thrash metal band from Birmingham, England. The band released it in 1988 on the independent record label Vinyl Solution, and followed it in 1990 with an altogether different sounding album, Tower of Spite,  following mass line-up changes and a switch to the major label Roadrunner Records. To support Life Sucks..., the band toured the UK with Bolt Thrower, Deviated Instinct, Doom, Electro Hippies, Concrete Sox, Bomb Disneyland, Hellbastard, Energetic Krusher, and Hard-Ons.

Overview
Following a successful demo in 1987, We Need Therapy, the band was picked up by London based label, Vinyl Solution, and set about recording a raw album which eventually gained exposure via the John Peel Radio 1 programme alongside emerging bands like Napalm Death and Extreme Noise Terror.

Track listing
All songs written by Cerebral Fix
"Warstorm" – 4:13  
"Cerebral Fix" – 2:57  
"Looniverse" – 2:30  
"Give Me Life" – 1:29  
"Soap Opera" – 0:35  
"Behind the Web" – 3:24  
"Product of Disgust" – 2:15  
"Life Sucks" – 1:17  
"Power Struggle" – 2:02  
"Go" – 0:12  
"Fear of Death" – 1:42  
"Acid Sick" – 1:56  
"Skate Drunk" – 1:19  
"Zombie" – 4:42  
"Existing Not Living" – 2:34

Credits
 Simon Forrest – vocals
 Tony Warburton – guitar
 Gregg Fellows – guitar
 Steve Watson – bass
 Adrian Jones – drums
 Recorded at Loco Studios, Usk, Wales, UK
 Produced by Iain Burgess

External links
Encyclopaedia Metallum album entry

1988 debut albums
Albums produced by Iain Burgess
Cerebral Fix albums